Barranca is a city in coastal Peru, capital of the Barranca Province in the Department of Lima.

Historically it started out as a small settlement port made up of local fisherman supplying fish alongside the port of Callao. It is, however, the city it is today mostly from its growth during the Republican era in Peru in the late 1890s to the 1930s.

Recent discoveries 
In March 2023, archaeologists from the Jagiellonian University and the National University of San Marcos announced the discovery of the Pre-Columbian temple made of dried bricks with the destroyed human burials near the Barranca. One of the skulls of the male individuals was placed in a 3 meter-long cloth ornamented with zoomorphic representations.

References

External links

  Municipal website

Populated places in the Lima Region